After the Empire: The Breakdown of the American Order is a 2001 book by French demographer and sociologist Emmanuel Todd. In it, Todd examines the fundamental weaknesses of the modern United States to conclude that, contrary to American conventional wisdom, America is fast losing its grip on the world stage in economic, military and ideological terms. Todd predicts the fall of the United States as the sole global superpower.

1976 prediction of Soviet collapse
Todd attracted attention in 1976 when, aged 25, he predicted the fall of the Soviet Union based on indicators such as increasing infant mortality rates. In the late 1970s, Todd was widely pronounced an "anti-communist", just as, following the publication of After the Empire, he has been attacked as "anti-American". He challenges these labels and describes himself as a historian and anthropologist first; and it was his concern as a historian, rather than political passion, that motivated him to write After the Empire. In late 2002, he believed that the world was about to repeat the same mistake that it had made in regard to the Soviet Union during the 1970s—misinterpreting an expansion in US military activity as a sign of its increasing power, when in fact this aggression masks a decline.

Post-Cold War geopolitical climate
Todd writes that the United States became an empire not by strategy but by accident, following the sudden collapse of its main adversary, the Soviet Union. With the globalization of investment, it then indulged in the luxury of conspicuous consumption  using incoming capital while going deeper and deeper into debt. In reality America is like a crumbling Roman Empire—overextended with excessive arms spending, inequality and disgruntlement at home. To keep the rest of the world in line, and prevent its creditors calling in their debts, all America needs to do then is to wield a big stick.

"The real America is too weak to take on anyone except military midgets," Todd states. This is why there is such hostility to states such as North Korea, Cuba, and Iraq, an underdeveloped country of 24 million exhausted by a decade of sanctions. Such "conflicts that represent little or no military risk" allow a US presence throughout the world. Further, the "theatrical media coverage...must not blind us to a fundamental reality: the size of the opponent chosen by the US is the true indicator of its current power". Todd argues that America would be incapable of challenging a more powerful country, and that "only one threat to global stability hangs over the world today—the United States itself, which was once a protector and is now a predator."

Predictions
Todd is above all a demographer, and he bases much of his opinion on statistical elements. Therefore, Todd notes some disturbing American trends, such as rising stratification based on educational credentials, and the "obsolescence of unreformable political institutions." Increasingly, he argues, the rest of the world is producing so that America can consume.

Todd argues the risk to the United States is that its clumsy tactics could backfire by provoking a geostrategic realignment and alliance in Europe and Asia. In the future the real power will rest with Europe. Todd suggests that Eurasia possesses the majority of global wealth and is able to work with other countries because it shares a universalist ethic that respects the rest of the world, including Arab and Muslim countries. Europe will evolve into a united force and its protected industrial base will allow it to rapidly reestablish its military might. Over time, Europe's and Russia's cultural friendship will strengthen and the Cold War-era ties which bind the United States together with Europe will be severed because of the vast divide separating "European and American civilizations", which Todd calls "the emancipation of Europe". If Europe, Russia and Japan draw closer as a result of the "drunken sailor" United States, then Washington will have achieved exactly the opposite of what it sought.

Solutions
Todd believes the US should return to its universalist and egalitarian roots, expressed in the 19th century, or make genuine attempts to expand civil rights and be a stabilizing element for the world, like they were in the 1950s. Todd also believes that Europe should rearrange the geopolitical balance around a Eurasian pole consisting of a Europe led by a trio of France, Germany and the United Kingdom, relying on Russia to provide military support as well as oil and natural gas.

Reception
According to Booklist, "[Todd] has written what may be the most important work since Francis Fukuyama's The End of History and the Last Man (1992)".

Alexander Kirshner wrote in the Washington Monthly that "Emmanuel Todd's After the Empire has been a bestseller in France for most of the last year--which should tell you a lot about the book even before you read the first page. In substance and rune, Todd's writing bears a strong resemblance to that of conservative intellectuals, like Robert Kagan, who proclaim the inevitability of American dominance. But Todd's thesis is the exact opposite of the neocons'...Like the neocons' worldview, Todd's theory combines a wishful vision of the future and nationalistic triumphalism in a way that sidesteps the facts...We and our allies are, in a word, interdependent. That may sound dull and 'interdependence' won't sell many books. But unlike the theories of Todd and the neocons, it happens to be true."

Clare Short wrote in the New Statesman: "I would recommend this extraordinary book to everyone troubled by US neo-imperialism. It asks why 'America is now commonly perceived as a narcissistic, warmongering bully. How did a country that until recently played an essential role in building international order suddenly become a symbol of global disorder?'...I doubt that anyone will sign up for all of Emmanuel Todd's analysis, but this is a brave and challenging book which contains a great deal of truth."

Anne Penketh wrote on The Independent that "Todd is at his most convincing when examining developments from his perspective as a demographer. He demonstrates the twin benefits of a drop in birth-rates and rise in literacy. His contrasting studies of American, European and Russian family structures are fascinating. After the Empire seems on shakier ground when drawing conclusions from economic trends".

Roger Kaplan wrote a very critical review of the book in The Weekly Standard: according to Kaplan "After the Empire is silly, mean-spirited, and anti-Semitic bile, bigoted to a degree that borders on racist condescension. It is poorly written and foolishly argued. When Todd thinks he has data supporting an argument, he uses them; when he wants to extend the argument to an area where there are inadequate data, he offers sweeping intuitions..."

See also
 American decline
 Ideocracy
 List of predictions
 State collapse
 Thucydides Trap – when one great power threatens to displace another, war is almost always the result

Notes

External links
 After the Empire at Archive.org

Books about geopolitics
French non-fiction books
Prediction
2003 non-fiction books
Foreign relations of the United States
Books about globalization